Caity Gyorgy is a Juno Award winning Canadian jazz singer from Calgary, Alberta. She received the Juno Award for Vocal Jazz Album of the Year in 2022 for her EP, Now Pronouncing: Caity Gyorgy, and in 2023 for her debut LP, Featuring. 

She is a graduate of the music program at Humber College and received her Masters of Music in jazz performance at McGill University. She released both her debut album No Bounds and the EP Now Pronouncing in 2021.

Gyorgy has performed at the Toronto Jazz Festival and the Calgary Jazz Festival. She has also performed alongside artists such as Allison Au, Jocelyn Gould, and Pat LaBarbera.

Biography

Gyorgy was born in Calgary, Alberta. In 2022, Gyorgy received her Masters of Music in jazz performance from McGill University under the tutelage of Christine Jensen.

References

External links

21st-century Canadian women singers
Canadian women jazz singers
Musicians from Calgary
Juno Award for Vocal Jazz Album of the Year winners
Living people
1998 births